Maranello is a town and comune in the province of Modena in Emilia-Romagna in Northern Italy, 18 km from Modena, with a population of 17,504 as of 2017. It is known worldwide as the home of Ferrari and the Formula 1 racing team, Scuderia Ferrari. Maranello was also home to coachbuilding firm Carrozzeria Scaglietti, owned by Ferrari.

Ferrari SpA
Maranello has been the location of the Ferrari factory since the early 1940s. During World War II, Enzo Ferrari transferred to Modena, ending its ownership of Alfa Romeo. Initially Ferrari's factory in Maranello was shared with Auto Avio Costruzioni, a machine tool manufacturing business started by Enzo to tide the company over while Alfa Romeo's ban on Enzo Ferrari making cars bearing the Ferrari name was in force. In Maranello is also located Museo Ferrari public museum, collecting sports and racing cars and trophies. 

Its new library opened in November 2011, and was designed by Arata Isozaki and Andrea Maffei.

Maranello is the starting point of the annual Italian Marathon, which finishes in nearby Carpi.

Main sights
Maranello's new town library was designed jointly by Andrea Maffei and Isozaki. The library opened in 2012.
The parish church of San Biagio was rebuilt in 1903.

People
Enzo Ferrari, car driver and founder of Ferrari (company)
Umberto Masetti (4 May 1926 - 28 May 2006 Maranello), World Champion Grand Prix motorcycle racer. 
Michael Schumacher, F1 racer and honorary citizen of Maranello
Edinson Cavani, Uruguayan footballer is of Italian descent from Maranello.

References

Twin towns
 Ozieri, Italy, since 1986
 Ittireddu, Italy, since 1986
 Bultei, Italy, since 1986
 Burgos, Italy, since 1986
 Termini Imerese, Italy, since 1986

External links

Cities and towns in Emilia-Romagna